Shyshkivtsi is a toponym of several populated places in Ukraine.

It may refer to:
 Shyshkivtsi, Brody Raion
 Shyshkivtsi, Borshchiv Hromada
 Shyshkivtsi, Kitsman Raion